Đurađ Dobrijević (born 13 January 1995) is a Serbian professional footballer who plays for Kolubara in the Serbian SuperLiga.

References

External links
 
 
 

1995 births
Living people
People from Sanski Most
Serbs of Bosnia and Herzegovina
Serbian footballers
Association football forwards
FK Teleoptik players
OFK Žarkovo players
FK Budućnost Dobanovci players
FK Kolubara players
Serbian First League players
Serbian SuperLiga players
Expatriate footballers in Austria
Serbian expatriate footballers
Serbian expatriate sportspeople in Austria